The 2015 Andalusian regional election was held on Sunday, 22 March 2015, to elect the 10th Parliament of the autonomous community of Andalusia. All 109 seats in the Parliament were up for election.

President Susana Díaz chose to terminate the coalition government between her Spanish Socialist Workers' Party (PSOE–A) and United Left (IULV–CA), dissolving the Parliament and calling a snap election for 22 March 2015. Andalusia had been traditionally considered a PSOE stronghold, being the only region in Spain in which no other party had led the regional government since the Spanish transition to democracy.

The PSOE–A regained first place from a declining People's Party (PP). Suffering from voters' anger at Mariano Rajoy's national government management of the economic crisis and the corruption scandals affecting the party nationwide, the PP scored its worst result since 1990. The election also saw a strong performance by newcomers Podemos (Spanish for "We can") and Citizens (C's), which faced their first electoral test since the 2014 European Parliament election. IULV–CA was decimated by Podemos's surge and obtained its worst historical showing.

After the election, the PP announced it would block any PSOE attempt to form a government, a shock to many after the party had assured during the electoral campaign that it would allow the most-voted party to access government. Podemos and C's remained reluctant to lend support to Susana Díaz's investiture, whereas IU was not willing to align with the Socialists again after their previous alliance broke up. In the end, however, after the 2015 Spanish regional and municipal elections were held, C's agreed to support Díaz investiture on less harsher conditions than initially required, in order to end the parliamentary deadlock and prevent a new election.

Overview

Electoral system
The Parliament of Andalusia was the devolved, unicameral legislature of the autonomous community of Andalusia, having legislative power in regional matters as defined by the Spanish Constitution of 1978 and the regional Statute of Autonomy, as well as the ability to vote confidence in or withdraw it from a regional president.

Voting for the Parliament was on the basis of universal suffrage, which comprised all nationals over 18 years of age, registered in Andalusia and in full enjoyment of their political rights. Additionally, Andalusians abroad were required to apply for voting before being permitted to vote, a system known as "begged" or expat vote. The 109 members of the Parliament of Andalusia were elected using the D'Hondt method and a closed list proportional representation, with an electoral threshold of three percent of valid votes—which included blank ballots—being applied in each constituency. Seats were allocated to constituencies, corresponding to the provinces of Almería, Cádiz, Córdoba, Granada, Huelva, Jaén, Málaga and Seville, with each being allocated an initial minimum of eight seats and the remaining 45 being distributed in proportion to their populations (provided that the number of seats in each province did not exceed two times that of any other).

The use of the D'Hondt method might result in a higher effective threshold, depending on the district magnitude.

Election date
The term of the Parliament of Andalusia expired four years after the date of its previous election, unless it was dissolved earlier. The election decree was required to be issued no later than the twenty-fifth day prior to the date of expiry of parliament and published on the following day in the Official Gazette of the Regional Government of Andalusia (BOJA), with election day taking place on the fifty-fourth day from publication barring any date within from 1 July to 31 August. The previous election was held on 25 March 2012, which meant that the legislature's term would have expired on 25 March 2016. The election decree was required to be published in the BOJA no later than 1 March 2016, with the election taking place on the fifty-fourth day from publication, setting the latest possible election date for the Parliament on Sunday, 24 April 2016.

The president had the prerogative to dissolve the Parliament of Andalusia and call a snap election, provided that no motion of no confidence was in process and that dissolution did not occur before one year had elapsed since the previous one. In the event of an investiture process failing to elect a regional president within a two-month period from the first ballot, the Parliament was to be automatically dissolved and a fresh election called.

Background
Despite losing the 2012 regional election to the People's Party (PP), which won a regional election in Andalusia for the first time since the establishment of the autonomous community, the Spanish Socialist Workers' Party (PSOE) under José Antonio Griñán was able to remain in office for a ninth consecutive term after forming a coalition government with United Left/The Greens–Assembly for Andalusia (IULV–CA).

In July 2013, José Antonio Griñán announced his intention to resign from office in order to "preserve the Regional Government from the erosion of the ERE scandal", a large slush fund corruption scheme involving former leading figures of the regional PSOE's branch, including former development minister Magdalena Álvarez, with former Andalusian president Manuel Chaves and himself being accused of knowing and concealing such a plot. Griñán was succeeded by Susana Díaz at the helm of the regional government.

Despite the apparent parliamentary comfort of the ruling coalition, friction between both PSOE and IU remained an issue throughout the entire legislature, especially after Susana Díaz took over the government in September 2013. In April 2014, an episode of IU's housing counsellor awarding several government houses to homeless families without the president's consent resulted in the counsellor seeing her competences removed and in the coalition pact nearly breaking up. In January 2015, tension between both coalition partners reached its peak after IU proposed holding a referendum among its members in June 2015 on whether to remain or withdraw from the government. In response, Susana Díaz declared that "we need a government which enjoys a stability that currently does not exist", opening the door for a snap election to be held within a short time. On 20 January Díaz met all eight PSOE provincial leaders in order to seek support within the party for a snap election in March 2015, which she received; subsequently, mutual attacks between both PSOE and IU, accusing each other of breaching the coalition agreement, made it clear that the only solution to the ongoing governmental crisis would come by the calling of a snap election.

An extraordinary parliamentary plenary session was held on Monday, 26 January, where Díaz announced the dissolution of parliament and the subsequent calling of a snap election for 22 March. Díaz herself had previously declared, during a PSOE rally in Seville, that "It is time for the Andalusian people to speak" and "We shall obtain the [people's] confidence in the ballots". Spanish media speculated that the snap election came as a result of different factors; namely, Susana Díaz's private aspirations to the Spanish Socialist Workers' Party's leadership—despite her publicly refusing it—, as well as both Podemos's surge in opinion polls and to prevent the party's exhaustion after all 2015 electoral calls—local and regional in May, Catalan in September and general in autumn—, in a time when opinion polls were still favorable to the PSOE in Andalusia.

On 17 February 2015, one month short of the election, the Spanish Supreme Court charged former Andalusian presidents Manuel Chaves and José Antonio Griñán in the ERE scandal for their possible responsibility in the misuse of the misappropriated public funds. The PSOE insisted on the same day that it would not require Chaves and Griñán to give up their seats in the Congress of Deputies and Senate, despite both incumbent president Susana Díaz and PSOE leader Pedro Sánchez having assured in the past that they would do so in the event of both of them being charged.

Parliamentary composition
The Parliament of Andalusia was officially dissolved on 27 January 2015, after the publication of the dissolution decree in the Official Gazette of the Regional Government of Andalusia. The table below shows the composition of the parliamentary groups in the chamber at the time of dissolution.

Parties and candidates
The electoral law allowed for parties and federations registered in the interior ministry, coalitions and groupings of electors to present lists of candidates. Parties and federations intending to form a coalition ahead of an election were required to inform the relevant Electoral Commission within ten days of the election call, whereas groupings of electors needed to secure the signature of at least one percent of the electorate in the constituencies for which they sought election, disallowing electors from signing for more than one list of candidates.

Below is a list of the main parties and electoral alliances which contested the election:

Campaign

Election debates

Opinion polls

Opinion polls
The tables below list opinion polling results in reverse chronological order, showing the most recent first and using the dates when the survey fieldwork was done, as opposed to the date of publication. Where the fieldwork dates are unknown, the date of publication is given instead. The highest percentage figure in each polling survey is displayed with its background shaded in the leading party's colour. If a tie ensues, this is applied to the figures with the highest percentages. The "Lead" column on the right shows the percentage-point difference between the parties with the highest percentages in a poll.

Graphical summary

Voting intention estimates
The table below lists weighted voting intention estimates. Refusals are generally excluded from the party vote percentages, while question wording and the treatment of "don't know" responses and those not intending to vote may vary between polling organisations. When available, seat projections determined by the polling organisations are displayed below (or in place of) the percentages in a smaller font; 55 seats were required for an absolute majority in the Parliament of Andalusia.

Voter turnout
The table below shows registered vote turnout on election day without including voters from the Census of Absent-Residents (CERA).

Results

Overall

Distribution by constituency

Aftermath

Results analysis
The result of the election was a hung parliament, with the PSOE winning the same number of seats it had previously—47. Still, it performed slightly better than what most polls had predicted, despite falling eight seats short of the absolute majority they had set as an objective. The PP plummeted to just 33 seats after scoring its best ever result in the 2012 election, suffering the burden of PM Mariano Rajoy's governance in the Spanish Government. This represented the party's worst result at a regional election in Andalusia since the 1990 election, falling below 30% of the vote. The main beneficiaries of the election were parties alternative to the considered "traditional" ones — Podemos and Citizens, both of them, despite polling slightly lower than what early polls predicted, winning seats for the first time in the Parliament of Andalusia.

The post-election scenario, however, turned more difficult than what was originally expected. IU collapse from 12 to 5 seats turned it into a minority force in the new parliament, preventing the PSOE from attempting a renewal of the 2012–2015 coalition—a scenario which IU itself refused, due to the abrupt dissolution of the previous agreement. The PP, initially widely expected to abstain in Susana Díaz's investiture voting in order to allow "a government of the most-voted party", announced instead that it would vote against Díaz's investiture.

Government formation

Newcomers Podemos and Citizens became decisive in the election of any future cabinet, yet remained reluctant to support a new PSOE government. The parties presented a series of harsh pre-agreement conditions, regarding political corruption and other issues, for the PSOE to comply with in order to allow for agreement talks:
Podemos offered to support Díaz's investiture only if she forced the resignation of former presidents Manuel Chaves and José Antonio Griñán (which at the time were MPs in the Congress of Deputies and Senate, respectively) because of their responsibility in the ERE scandal; that political parties were turned into subsidiary responsible for ensuring that misused public money was returned; that the Andalusian government cancelled all agreements or accounts with financial institutions running housing evictions, as well as prompting legislation to prevent any future eviction; and finally, the readmission of personnel in education, health, equality and social welfare sectors fired as a result of the spending cuts, with a decrease in the number of party officials and advisers. In the event those conditions were not accepted, Podemos would vote against Díaz.
Citizens (C's) demanded the immediate resignation of Chaves and Griñán before entering any talks with Susana Díaz's party. Party leader Albert Rivera, however, opened the door to allowing Díaz's investiture if that condition was met, but ruled out any possible entry into a future Díaz's government.
The People's Party (PP) offered to easen Susana Díaz's investiture only if the PSOE allowed "the most-voted party" to rule in the local councils after the May local elections, as an attempt to prevent left-wing coalitions from withholding the PP from forming the government of the region's provincial capitals.

Susana Díaz immediately ruled out the PP conditions, requesting party regional leader Juan Manuel Moreno to "act with responsibility, without pretending weird exchanges that the people would not understand". Moreno, in response, accused Díaz of "arrogancy" and told her that "with 47 seats one can't pretend to negotiate as if one had 55 [an absolute majority of seats]".

Susana Díaz's investiture for a second term as president of Andalusia remained unclear for one month. She explicitly expressed her intention to form a minority cabinet, ruling out a coalition with any other party; however, until June 2015 she was not able to prevent all other parties from blocking her election. Andalusian law established that if no candidate was elected president in the two months following the first investiture ballot, then parliament was to be automatically dissolved and a new election would be held no later than September 2015.

Susana Díaz was unable to get a favorable vote in either of the three votings that took place in 5, 8 and 14 May, as all four PP, Podemos, C's and IU voted against her election. Further, negotiations between Díaz's PSOE and the opposition parties broke off when, on 13 May—the eve of the third investiture vote—it was unveiled that the Andalusian government had awarded the exploitation of the Aznalcóllar mine to a governmental-favored firm through illegal means and "without observing the slightest rigor" in February–March 2015, previously and during the regional election campaign. With Díaz's government refusing to give explanations over the scandal, all four parties reassured their negative to allow for Díaz's investiture in the 14 May vote, with then-acting president Susana Díaz blaming all four opposition parties of imposing a "political blockade" over Andalusia and threatening them with a new election in the event of her failing to get elected.

PP regional leader Juan Manuel Moreno accused Díaz of "arrogance" and of "asking them to allow her investiture without yielding to their conditions", also asking himself why Díaz kept holding investiture votings if no inter-party agreement had been reached. Teresa Rodríguez from Podemos also criticised Díaz for not accepting her party's conditions, blaming the PSOE for the political instability in the region and stating that a new election would mean the PSOE's failure in forming a government through dialogue. All opposition parties also reiterated their position that they did not trust Díaz to fulfill any compromise once she did get elected.

New investiture votes were initially postponed until after the 24 May Spanish regional and local elections as a result of the electoral campaign centering the political focus. However, on 5 June, on the impossibility to have Díaz formally invested, the PSOE threatened the opposition parties with letting the legal time limit for the automatic dissolution of the parliament to expire should an agreement not be reached with anyone before Tuesday, 9 June. In the end, the PSOE and C's reached an agreement, with the latter accepting to support Díaz to end the parliamentary deadlock and prevent a new election, lifting off their requirement for Chaves and Griñan's resignations before considering to enter negotiations with the PSOE.

Notes

References
Opinion poll sources

Other

2015 in Andalusia
Andalusia
Regional elections in Andalusia
March 2015 events in Spain